Under the Tonto Rim is a 1933 American pre-Code Western film directed by Henry Hathaway and starring Stuart Erwin and Verna Hillie. The film is a remake of a 1928 silent film starring Richard Arlen and Mary Brian. Both are based on the Zane Grey 1926 novel of the same name, as is a 1947 film.

Print held by the Library of Congress.

Plot
A complete failure as a ranch cowhand and then a chuckwagon driver, Tonto Daley's embarrassment is total after accidentally causing a wagon to tip over and his boss's daughter Nina Weston to fall into a creek.

Tonto hits the trail with his tail between his legs, taking a job from Porky and Tom to become a hog farmer. He is miserable and lonely, and things get worse when former foreman Munther tries to railroad Tonto in the rustling of some cattle. He finds out Porky and Tom are in on it, and Nina becomes Tonto's ally in the fight to make things right.

Cast
 Stuart Erwin as Tonto Daley
 Fred Kohler as Munther
 Raymond Hatton as Porky
 Verna Hillie as Nina Weston
 John Lodge as Joe Gilbert
 George Barbier as Weston

References

External links
 
 

1933 films
1933 Western (genre) films
American Western (genre) films
American black-and-white films
Remakes of American films
Films based on American novels
Films based on works by Zane Grey
Films directed by Henry Hathaway
Sound film remakes of silent films
1930s English-language films
1930s American films